Showdown at Boot Hill is a 1958 American Western film directed by Gene Fowler Jr., written by Louis Vittes, and starring Charles Bronson, Robert Hutton, John Carradine, Carole Mathews, Fintan Meyler and Paul Maxey. The film was released on May 1, 1958, by 20th Century Fox.

It was the first film Gene Fowler Jr. made for Regal Films.

Plot
An unusual western plot that is character driven and reaches beyond right/wrong morality, requiring its male and female leads to develop and act on introspection. Bronson portrays a Marshall who has turned bounty hunter explicitly as a reaction to his being "short" and unable to command the allegiance of those he is to protect. His beliefs and lifestyle are challenged by Doc played by John Carradine who sees something of his younger self in this angry man with a gun. Also driving the psychological elements of the film is the Marshall's growing attachment to Jill (Carole Mathews) and her daughter Sally (Fintan Meyler).

Cast
Charles Bronson as Luke Welsh
Robert Hutton as Sloane
John Carradine as Doc Weber
Carole Mathews as Jill Crane
Fintan Meyler as Sally Crane
Paul Maxey as Judge Wallen
Thomas Browne Henry as Con Maynor 
William Stevens as Corky
Martin Smith as Tex
Joe McGuinn as Mr. Creavy 
George Douglas as Charles Maynor
Mike Mason as Les Patton 
George Pembroke as Sheriff Hinkle
Argentina Brunetti as Mrs. Bonaventura
Ed Wright as Brent
Stacey Marshall as Saloon Girl
Shirley Haven as Customer

Production
The film was shot in late 1957, and gave an early lead role to Charles Bronson.

The film was the first in a series that Gene Fowler Jr. made for Robert L. Lippert. Fowler said "that Lippert experience was wonderful in a way because we had the run of the Fox lot; whatever sets happened to be still standing, we'd use those sets. My partner, Lou Vittes and I, would walk through those sets that had already been used for more expensive pictures than we could make and we would pretty much write the script around those sets."

Parts of the theme song sound similar to the theme from The Man Who Shot Liberty Valance, directed by John Ford four years later and starring John Wayne, James Stewart and Lee Marvin.

References

External links
 

1958 films
20th Century Fox films
American Western (genre) films
1958 Western (genre) films
Films directed by Gene Fowler Jr.
Revisionist Western (genre) films
1950s English-language films
1950s American films